The 2019 United Kingdom general election was held on Thursday 12 December 2019, two and a half years after the previous general election in June 2017. The Scottish National Party (SNP) received the most votes (45%, up 8.1% from the previous election) and won 48 out of 59 seats—a gain of 13 over those won in 2017, and 81% of the Scottish seats in the House of Commons.

SNP gains came at the expense of both Labour and the Conservatives. The Tories remained the largest unionist party in Scotland even though they lost more than half of their Scottish seats, winning six compared to thirteen in 2017. Labour was reduced to only one seat, down from seven. The Liberal Democrats managed to win four Scottish seats for no net change, although party leader Jo Swinson (herself the only major party leader to stand for election in Scotland) was unseated in her bid for re-election by her SNP challenger.

Labour's vote share was its lowest at a Westminster election in Scotland since December 1910.

Political context
The June 2017 general election in Scotland was fought in the aftermath of the 2016 Scottish Parliament election, in which the SNP won a third term in government but lost its overall majority in the Scottish Parliament (although the proportional electoral system at Holyrood was intentionally designed to make it very difficult for any one party to gain a majority). The 2016 EU referendum was held a month later on Thursday 23 June, and the final result was for the United Kingdom to leave the EU, although Scotland voted 62.0% Remain. Negotiations then began after the invocation of Article 50 of the Treaty on European Union in March 2017, which was expected to dominate the snap general election campaign.

In March First Minister Nicola Sturgeon called for a second independence referendum due to Scotland's vote to remain in the EU the previous year. The result was the issue dominated the 2017 general election and, although the SNP remained the largest party, their number of seats was much reduced, with the Scottish Conservatives, Labour and the Liberal Democrats gaining a total of 21 seats. Former First Minister Alex Salmond and Westminster leader Angus Robertson were among those who lost their seats.

In the 2019 European Parliament election, Scottish Labour lost its two MEPs, UKIP lost its seat, the SNP increased its number to three, the Scottish Conservatives held theirs and the Brexit Party and Liberal Democrats gained one each.

Opinion polling

Seat projections

Campaign events

Television debates 

Like the rest of the United Kingdom, Scottish broadcasters hosted television debates. On 20 November, BBC Scotland's flagship political programme, Debate Night, moderated by Stephen Jardine, hosted a Young Voter's Special with representatives from the main parties where they debated in front of an audience of voters aged under 30. On 3 December, STV hosted a television debate moderated by Colin Mackay and BBC Scotland announced that they would host a debate on 10 December, two days before the election, moderated by Sarah Smith.

The Scottish National Party have been represented in UK-wide television debates in addition due to being the third largest party in the House of Commons.

Reaction

Leader's interviews

In addition to television debates, BBC Scotland and STV also interviewed Scottish party leaders on The Nine and Scotland Tonight in the run-up to the general election, alongside guest commentary too.

On 4 December, the four main Scottish party leaders took part in leaders interviews with fictional character Chief Commissioner Cameron Mickelson from the BBC Scotland sitcom, Scot Squad.

Results

Votes summary

List of constituencies by party

Target seats

Scottish Conservatives

Scottish Labour

Scottish Liberal Democrats

Scottish National Party

See also 
 2019 United Kingdom general election in England
 2019 United Kingdom general election in Northern Ireland
 2019 United Kingdom general election in Wales

Footnotes

References

Scotland
United Kingdom General Election Results In Scotland, 2019
2010s elections in Scotland
2019
Scotland, United Kingdom general election in